Batik Kulambu Island is a Malaysian island located in Darvel Bay, about 8 kilometres off Kunak in the state of Sabah. The island extends for about 4.9 kilometres from east to west and about 2 kilometres from north to south. The highest point is 249 metres above sea level to the tops of the trees. A narrow channel to the south-east separates Batik Kulambu from the larger island of Timbun Mata.

See also
 List of islands of Malaysia

References 

Islands of Sabah